Dashnicë (Serbian Cyrillic: Даздинце) is a village in Kamenica municipality, Kosovo. It is located in the Gollak mountains.

Etymology 
The form Dashnica or Dazhnica came from the prefix Dashtn-icë, which also explains its documented form Dazhdaniça or Dazhdince with an anaptotic sound / a / or / i / in the Ottoman or Slavic form.

History 
For the first time the name of this village is mentioned with the registration of the years 1566-74 in the form Dazhdaniça as a village of the region of Topolonica.

Demographics 
The village, as of 2011, has 80 inhabitants. 77 of them are Albanians, 1 is a Bosniak and 2 others.

References 

Villages in Kamenica, Kosovo